The Delaware Division of Libraries Is the official library agency for Delaware located in Dover, Delaware. The agency is responsible for Delaware Library Access Services (DLAS), the statewide summer reading program in conjunction with Delaware Libraries, and offering professional development opportunities for librarians statewide. They also run the Delaware Library Catalog.

History
The Delaware State Library Commission was formed by an act of the legislature in 1901, its chairman was Manlove Hayes. At this time the state only had two free public libraries, one in Wilmington and one in Dover.

References

External links
Official website

State libraries of the United States
Libraries in Delaware
Public libraries in Delaware
1901 establishments in Delaware
Government agencies established in 1901
State agencies of Delaware
Buildings and structures in Dover, Delaware